The quickstep is a light-hearted dance of the standard ballroom dances. The movement of the dance is fast and powerfully flowing and sprinkled with syncopations. The upbeat melodies that quickstep is danced to make it suitable for both formal and informal events. Quickstep was developed in the 1920s in New York City and was first danced by Black Americans. Its origins are in combination of slow foxtrot combined with the Charleston, a dance which was one of the precursors to what today is called swing dancing.

History
The quickstep evolved in the 1920s from a combination of the foxtrot, Charleston, shag, peabody, and one-step. The dance is English in origin and was standardized in 1927. While it evolved from the foxtrot, the quickstep now is quite separate. Unlike the modern foxtrot, the leader often closes his feet, and syncopated steps are regular occurrences (as was the case in early foxtrot). Three characteristic dance figures of the quickstep are the chassés, where the feet are brought together, the quarter turns, and the lock step.p126

This dance gradually evolved into a very dynamic one with much movement on the dance floor, with many advanced patterns including hops, runs, quick steps with much momentum, and rotation. The tempo of quickstep dance is rather brisk, as it was developed to ragtime era jazz music, which is fast-paced when compared to other dance music.

By the end of the 20th century the complexity of quickstep as done by advanced dancers had increased, with the extensive use of syncopated steps with eighth note durations. While in older times quickstep patterns were counted with "quick" (one beat) and "slow" (two beats) steps, many advanced patterns today are cued with split beats, such as "quick-and-quick-and-quick, quick, slow", with there being further steps on the 'and's.

Style
The quickstep is elegant like the foxtrot and should be smooth and glamorous. The dancers should appear to be very light on their feet. It is very energetic and form-intensive.
The quickstep is danced to 4/4 music of 48 to 52 measures per minute.

Syllabus
The two International Style syllabi of ISTD and IDTA for quickstep differ very little.

The American Style dance competition program does not include quickstep, but a limited version of the dance is taught and danced socially in some American dance venues.

Pre-bronze
 Quarter turn to right
 Natural turn
 Natural turn with hesitation
 Natural pivot turn
 Natural spin turn
 Progressive chassé
 Chassé reverse turn
 Forward lock
 Heel pivot (quarter turn to left)

Silver
 Quick open reverse
 Fishtail
 Running right turn
 Four quick run
 V6
 Closed telemark

Gold
 Cross swivel
 Six quick run
 Rumba cross
 Tipsy to right
 Tipsy to left
 Hover corté

In popular culture 
The quickstep is one of multiple dances performed on the celebrity talent show Dancing with the Stars, as well as Strictly Come Dancing.

References

External links
A sample listing of the Quickstep syllabus
 ISTD Quickstep syllabus at the Dance Central website